Esclavelles is a commune in the Seine-Maritime department in the Normandy region in northern France.

Geography
Junction 10 of the A28 autoroute lies within the commune's territory.

Population

Places of interest
 An eighteenth-century presbytery.
 The fifteenth-century fortified farmhouse, occupied by the English during the Hundred Years War.
 The church of Notre-Dame, dating from the eleventh century.

See also
Communes of the Seine-Maritime department

References

Communes of Seine-Maritime